The Athletic Federation of Slovenia (Slovenian Atletska zveza Slovenije) is the governing body for the sport of athletics in Slovenia.

Affiliations 
International Association of Athletics Federations (IAAF)
European Athletic Association (EA)
Slovenian Olympic Committee
Association of the Balkan Athletics Federations  (ABAF)

National records 
AZS maintains the Slovenian records in athletics.

External links 
Official webpage

Slovenia
Sports governing bodies in Slovenia
National governing bodies for athletics